Papradište is a village in the municipality of Čaška, North Macedonia. It used to be part of the former municipality of Bogomila. It historically has been identified as a Mijak village.

Demographics
According to the 2021 census, the village had a total of 14 inhabitants. Ethnic groups in the village include:

Macedonians 14

Notable people
Dimitrija Čupovski, writer, lexicographer, and activist
Andrey Damyanov, architect
Nace Dimov, writer and activist
Đorđe Zografski, artist

References

Villages in Čaška Municipality